The Lister Costin is a lightweight sports racing car, designed by British engineer and designer Frank Costin, and developed and built by British manufacturer Lister, between 1958 and 1959. A total of 17 models were produced. They were powered by either a Jaguar straight-6 engine, or a Chevrolet V8 engine.

References

Lister Knobbly
Cars of England
Jaguar vehicles
Rear-wheel-drive vehicles
Cars introduced in 1957
Sports racing cars
1950s cars